A succubus is a demon or supernatural entity in folklore, in female form, that appears in dreams to seduce men, usually through sexual activity. According to religious tradition, a succubus needs semen to survive; repeated sexual activity with a succubus will result in a bond being formed between the succubus and the man; and a succubus cannot drain or harm the man with whom she is having intercourse. In modern representations, a succubus is often depicted as a beautiful seductress or enchantress, rather than as demonic or frightening. The male counterpart to the succubus is the incubus.

Etymology
The term derives from Late Latin  "paramour" from  "to lie beneath" (- "under" and  "to lie"), used to describe this being's implied sexual position relative to the sleeper's position. The English word "succubus" dates from the late 14th century. The succubus is also known as the earth wanderer.

In folklore
As depicted in the Jewish mystical treatise Zohar and the medieval Jewish satirical text Alphabet of Ben Sira, Lilith was Adam's first wife, who later became a succubus. She left Adam and refused to return to the Garden of Eden after she mated with the archangel Samael. In Zoharistic Kabbalah, there were four succubi who mated with the archangel Samael. The four original queens of the demons were Lilith, Eisheth Zenunim, Agrat bat Mahlat, and Naamah. A succubus may take a form of a beautiful young girl, but closer inspection may reveal deformities of her body, such as bird-like claws or serpentine tails. Folklore also describes the act of cunnilingus on their vulvas, which drip with urine and other fluids. In later folklore, a succubus took the form of a siren.

Throughout history, priests and rabbis, including Hanina ben Dosa and Abaye, tried to curb the power of succubi over humans. However, not all succubi were malevolent. According to Walter Map in the satire  (Trifles of Courtiers), Pope Sylvester II (999–1003) was allegedly involved with a succubus named Meridiana, who helped him achieve his high rank in the Catholic Church. Before his death, he confessed of his sins and died repentant.

Ability to reproduce
According to the Kabbalah and the school of Rashba, the original three queens of the demons, Agrat bat Mahlat, Naamah, Eisheth Zenunim, and all their cohorts give birth to children, except Lilith. According to other legends, the children of Lilith are called Lilin.

Incubi, or male demons, then use the semen to impregnate human females, thus explaining how demons could apparently sire children, despite the traditional belief that they were incapable of reproduction. Children so begotten—cambions—were supposed to be those that were born deformed, or more susceptible to supernatural influences. While the book does not address why a human female impregnated with the semen of a human male would not produce regular human offspring, an explanation could be that the semen is altered before being transferred to the female host.

King James in his dissertation titled Dæmonologie refutes the possibility for angelic entities to reproduce and instead offered a suggestion that a devil would carry out two methods of impregnating women - the first, to steal the sperm out of a dead man and deliver it into a woman. If a demon could extract the semen quickly, the substance could not be instantly transported to a female host, causing it to go cold. This explains his view that succubi and incubi were the same demonic entity, only to be described differently based on the tormented sexes being conversed with. The second method was the idea that a dead body could be possessed by a devil, causing it to rise and have sexual relations with others. However, no mention has been found of a female corpse being possessed to elicit sex from men.

In non-Western literature

Buddhist canon
A Buddhist scripture regarding prayer to Avalokiteśvara, the Dharani Sutra of Amoghapāśa, promises to those who pray that "you will not be attacked by demons who either suck your energy or make love to you in your dreams."

Arabian mythology
A  "sleeps with the person and has relations during sleep as is known by the dreams". They are said to be invisible, but a person with "second sight" can see them, often in the form of a cat, dog, or other household pet. "In Omdurman it is a spirit which possesses. ... Only certain people are possessed and such people cannot marry or the qarina will harm them."

In fiction

Throughout history, succubi have been popular characters in music, literature, film, television, and more.

See also
 List of mythological creatures

References

Further reading

External links 
 
 

 
Christian mythology
Demons in Christianity
Demons in Judaism
Demons
Devils
Female legendary creatures
Jewish mysticism
Jinn
Jinniyyat
Lilith
Medieval European legendary creatures
Sleep in mythology and folklore
Supernatural legends
Dream